"Investigative Journalism" is the thirteenth episode of the first season of the American comedy television series Community. It aired in the United States on NBC on January 14, 2010.

Plot 
The group returns from their winter break and finds that a new student named Buddy (Jack Black) has inserted himself into the study group. Buddy proves to be a burden to the group, accidentally kicking Jeff in the nose and making abrupt comments when they try to study, Eventually, during a session where Buddy refuses to leave, Jeff drags him off outside (Buddy's pants being ripped in the process). Eventually, the group votes to allow Buddy to join, but he reveals that they were his safety study group, and he joins another group (lead by Owen Wilson) he claims to be cooler.

Meanwhile, Dean Pelton (Jim Rash) makes Jeff (Joel McHale) the new editor of the Greendale Gazette Journal Mirror, where Annie (Alison Brie) discovers a story about Dean Pelton's racial profiling in the school. Jeff tries to convince a resistant Annie to drop the story, although she ends up abandoning it, realising how trivial it actually is.

In the end tag, Troy (Donald Glover) and Abed (Danny Pudi) are interviewed by Star-Burns (Dino Stamatopoulos) for possible membership in the cool group. Pierce (Chevy Chase) shows up and berates them for their disloyalty. After they walk away Pierce asks if the group has decided on his own membership, which Star-Burns declines.

Cultural references 
Abed compares Jeff to the M*A*S*H character Hawkeye Pierce, and himself to the character Radar. The episode also parodies that show's ending credits, including the same tune.

Continuity
Flashbacks to previous episodes such as "Advanced Criminal Law" are shown.

Reception 
Around 5.42 million Americans watched "Investigative Journalism".

Emily VanDerWerff of The A.V. Club rated the episode A−, saying it was "yet another really great episode in a very consistent run the show's been on lately."

References

External links
 "Investigative Journalism" at NBC.com
 

Community (season 1) episodes
2010 American television episodes
Television episodes about journalism